Oklahoma was admitted to the Union on November 16, 1907 and elects United States senators to Class 2 and Class 3. The state's current U.S. senators are Republicans James Lankford (serving since 2015) and Markwayne Mullin (serving since 2023). Jim Inhofe is Oklahoma's longest-serving senator (1994–2023).

List of senators

|- style="height:2em"
| colspan=3 | Vacant
| nowrap | Nov 16, 1907 –Dec 11, 1907
| Oklahoma did not elect its senators until one month after statehood.
| rowspan=4 | 1
| 
| rowspan=2 | 1
| Oklahoma did not elect its senators until one month after statehood.
| nowrap | Nov 16, 1907 –Dec 11, 1907
| colspan=3 | Vacant

|- style="height:2em"
! rowspan=9 | 1
| rowspan=9 align=left | Robert L. Owen
| rowspan=9  | Democratic
| rowspan=9 nowrap | Dec 11, 1907 –Mar 4, 1925
| rowspan=3 | Elected in 1907.
| Elected in 1907.
| rowspan=7 nowrap | Dec 11, 1907 –Mar 4, 1921
| rowspan=7  | Democratic
| rowspan=7 align=right | Thomas Gore
! rowspan=7 | 1

|- style="height:2em"
| 
| rowspan=3 | 2
| rowspan=3 | Re-elected in 1909.

|- style="height:2em"
| 

|- style="height:2em"
| rowspan=3 | Re-elected in 1913.
| rowspan=3 | 2
| 

|- style="height:2em"
| 
| rowspan=3 | 3
| rowspan=3 | Re-elected in 1914.Lost renomination.

|- style="height:2em"
| 

|- style="height:2em"
| rowspan=3 | Re-elected in 1918.Retired.
| rowspan=3 | 3
| 

|- style="height:2em"
| 
| rowspan=3 | 4
| rowspan=3 | Elected in 1920.Lost re-election.
| rowspan=3 nowrap | Mar 4, 1921 –Mar 4, 1927
| rowspan=3  | Republican
| rowspan=3 align=right | John W. Harreld
! rowspan=3 | 2

|- style="height:2em"
| 

|- style="height:2em"
! rowspan=3 | 2
| rowspan=3 align=left | William B. Pine
| rowspan=3  | Republican
| rowspan=3 nowrap | Mar 4, 1925 –Mar 4, 1931
| rowspan=3 | Elected in 1924.Lost re-election.
| rowspan=3 | 4
| 

|- style="height:2em"
| 
| rowspan=3 | 5
| rowspan=3 | Elected in 1926.
| rowspan=12 nowrap | Mar 4, 1927 –Jan 3, 1951
| rowspan=12  | Democratic
| rowspan=12 align=right | Elmer Thomas
! rowspan=12 | 3

|- style="height:2em"
| 

|- style="height:2em"
! rowspan=3 | 3
| rowspan=3 align=left | Thomas Gore
| rowspan=3  | Democratic
| rowspan=3 nowrap | Mar 4, 1931 –Jan 3, 1937
| rowspan=3 | Elected in 1930.Lost renomination.
| rowspan=3 | 5
| 

|- style="height:2em"
| 
| rowspan=3 | 6
| rowspan=3 | Re-elected in 1932.

|- style="height:2em"
| 

|- style="height:2em"
! rowspan=3 | 4
| rowspan=3 align=left | Joshua B. Lee
| rowspan=3  | Democratic
| rowspan=3 nowrap | Jan 3, 1937 –Jan 3, 1943
| rowspan=3 | Elected in 1936.Lost re-election.
| rowspan=3 | 6
| 

|- style="height:2em"
| 
| rowspan=3 | 7
| rowspan=3 | Re-elected in 1938.

|- style="height:2em"
| 

|- style="height:2em"
! rowspan=3 | 5
| rowspan=3 align=left | Edward H. Moore
| rowspan=3  | Republican
| rowspan=3 nowrap | Jan 3, 1943 –Jan 3, 1949
| rowspan=3 | Elected in 1942.Retired.
| rowspan=3 | 7
| 

|- style="height:2em"
| 
| rowspan=3 | 8
| rowspan=3 | Re-elected in 1944.Lost renomination.

|- style="height:2em"
| 

|- style="height:2em"
! rowspan=7 | 6
| rowspan=7 align=left | Robert S. Kerr
| rowspan=7  | Democratic
| rowspan=7 nowrap | Jan 3, 1949 –Jan 1, 1963
| rowspan=3 | Elected in 1948.
| rowspan=3 | 8
| 

|- style="height:2em"
| 
| rowspan=3 | 9
| rowspan=3 | Elected in 1950.
| rowspan=12 nowrap | Jan 3, 1951 –Jan 3, 1969
| rowspan=12  | Democratic
| rowspan=12 align=right | Mike Monroney
! rowspan=12 | 4

|- style="height:2em"
| 

|- style="height:2em"
| rowspan=3 | Re-elected in 1954.
| rowspan=3 | 9
| 

|- style="height:2em"
| 
| rowspan=4 | 10
| rowspan=4 | Re-elected in 1956.

|- style="height:2em"
| 

|- style="height:2em"
| Re-elected in 1960.Died.
| rowspan=6 | 10
| 

|- style="height:2em"
| rowspan=2 colspan=3 | Vacant
| rowspan=2 nowrap | Jan 1, 1963 –Jan 7, 1963
| rowspan=2 |  

|- style="height:2em"
| 
| rowspan=5 | 11
| rowspan=5 | Re-elected in 1962.Lost re-election.

|- style="height:2em"
! 7
| align=left | J. Howard Edmondson
|  | Democratic
| nowrap | Jan 7, 1963 –Nov 3, 1964
| Appointed to continue Kerr's termLost nomination to finish Kerr's term.

|- style="height:2em"
! rowspan=5 | 8
| rowspan=5 align=left | Fred R. Harris
| rowspan=5  | Democratic
| rowspan=5 nowrap | Nov 3, 1964 –Jan 3, 1973
| rowspan=2 | Elected to finish Kerr's term.

|- style="height:2em"
| 

|- style="height:2em"
| rowspan=3 | Re-elected in 1966.Retired.
| rowspan=3 | 11
| 

|- style="height:2em"
| 
| rowspan=3 | 12
| rowspan=3 | Elected in 1968.
| rowspan=6 nowrap | Jan 3, 1969 –Jan 3, 1981
| rowspan=6  | Republican
| rowspan=6 align=right | Henry Bellmon
! rowspan=6 | 5

|- style="height:2em"
| 

|- style="height:2em"
! rowspan=3 | 9
| rowspan=3 align=left | Dewey F. Bartlett
| rowspan=3  | Republican
| rowspan=3 nowrap | Jan 3, 1973 –Jan 3, 1979
| rowspan=3 | Elected in 1972.Retired.
| rowspan=3 | 12
| 

|- style="height:2em"
| 
| rowspan=3 | 13
| rowspan=3 | Re-elected in 1974.Retired.

|- style="height:2em"
| 

|- style="height:2em"
! rowspan=8 | 10
| rowspan=8 align=left | David Boren
| rowspan=8  | Democratic
| rowspan=8 nowrap | Jan 3, 1979 –Nov 15, 1994
| rowspan=3 | Elected in 1978.
| rowspan=3 | 13
| 

|- style="height:2em"
| 
| rowspan=3 | 14
| rowspan=3 | Elected in 1980.
| rowspan=14 nowrap | Jan 3, 1981 –Jan 3, 2005
| rowspan=14  | Republican
| rowspan=14 align=right | Don Nickles
! rowspan=14 | 6

|- style="height:2em"
| 

|- style="height:2em"
| rowspan=3 | Re-elected in 1984.
| rowspan=3 | 14
| 

|- style="height:2em"
| 
| rowspan=3 | 15
| rowspan=3 | Re-elected in 1986.

|- style="height:2em"
| 

|- style="height:2em"
| rowspan=2 | Re-elected in 1990.Resigned to become President of the University of Oklahoma.
| rowspan=5 | 15
| 

|- style="height:2em"
| 
| rowspan=5 | 16
| rowspan=5 | Re-elected in 1992.

|- style="height:2em"
| colspan=3 | Vacant
| nowrap | Nov 15, 1994 –Nov 16, 1994
|  

|- style="height:2em"
! rowspan=15 | 11
| rowspan=15 align=left | Jim Inhofe
| rowspan=15  | Republican
| rowspan=15 nowrap | Nov 16, 1994 –Jan 3, 2023
| rowspan=2 | Elected in 1994 to finish Boren's term.

|- style="height:2em"
| 

|- style="height:2em"
| rowspan=3 | Re-elected in 1996.
| rowspan=3 | 16
| 

|- style="height:2em"
| 
| rowspan=3 | 17
| rowspan=3 | Re-elected in 1998.Retired.

|- style="height:2em"
| 

|- style="height:2em"
| rowspan=3 | Re-elected in 2002.
| rowspan=3 | 17
| 

|- style="height:2em"
| 
| rowspan=3 | 18
| rowspan=3 | Elected in 2004.
| rowspan=5 nowrap | Jan 3, 2005 –Jan 3, 2015
| rowspan=5  | Republican
| rowspan=5 align=right | Tom Coburn
! rowspan=5 | 7

|- style="height:2em"
| 

|- style="height:2em"
| rowspan=3 | Re-elected in 2008.
| rowspan=3 | 18
| 

|- style="height:2em"
| 
| rowspan=3 | 19
| rowspan=2 | Re-elected in 2010.Resigned.

|- style="height:2em"
| 

|- style="height:2em"
| rowspan=3 | Re-elected in 2014.
| rowspan=3 | 19
| 
| Elected in 2014	to finish Coburn's term.
| rowspan=7 nowrap | Jan 3, 2015 –Present
| rowspan=7  | Republican
| rowspan=7 align=right | James Lankford
! rowspan=7 | 8

|- style="height:2em"
| 
| rowspan=3 | 20
| rowspan=3 | Re-elected in 2016.

|- style="height:2em"
| 

|- style="height:2em"
| Re-elected in 2020.Resigned.
| rowspan=3 | 20
| 

|- style="height:2em"
! rowspan=2 | 12
| rowspan=2 align=left | Markwayne Mullin
| rowspan=2  | Republican
| rowspan=2 | Jan 3, 2023 –Present
| rowspan=2 | Elected in 2022 to finish Inhofe's term.
| 
| rowspan=3 | 21
| rowspan=3 | Re-elected in 2022.

|- style="height:2em"
| 

|- style="height:2em"
| rowspan=2 colspan=5 | To be determined in the 2026 election.
| rowspan=2| 21
| 

|- style="height:2em"
| 
| 22
| colspan=5 | To be determined in the 2028 election.

See also

 List of United States representatives from Oklahoma
 United States congressional delegations from Oklahoma
 Elections in Oklahoma

References
 

 
United States Senators
Oklahoma